The River Font is a river that flows through Northumberland, England. The river is a tributary of the River Wansbeck which it joins at Mitford.

References

External links

Rivers of Northumberland